Sophisticated Lou is an album by jazz saxophonist Lou Donaldson recorded for the Blue Note label featuring Donaldson with Joe Farrell, Paul Winter, Joe Venuto, Derek Smith, Jay Berliner, Richard Davis, Ron Carter, Grady Tate, and Omar Clay with a string section arranged by Wade Marcus.

The album was awarded 2 stars in an Allmusic review by Stephen Thomas Erlewine who stated "Sophisticated Lou pales when compared to the great Lush Life, but it remains a fairly successful effort, and it's a nice change of pace after several albums of funky soul-jazz".

Track listing
All compositions by Lou Donaldson except as indicated
 "You've Changed" (Bill Carey, Carl T. Fischer) - 4:55     
 "Stella by Starlight" (Ned Washington, Victor Young) - 4:45     
 "What Are You Doing the Rest of Your Life?" (Alan Bergman, Marilyn Bergman, Michel Legrand) - 4:32     
 "Long Goodbye" (Johnny Mercer, John Williams) - 3:32     
 "You Are the Sunshine of My Life" (Stevie Wonder) - 3:46     
 "Autumn in New York" (Vernon Duke) - 4:31    
 "Blues Walk" - 5:07     
 "Time After Time" (Sammy Cahn, Jule Styne) - 6:45
Recorded at A&R Studios, NYC on December 8 (tracks 1, 3, 6 & 8), December 11 (tracks 2, 4, 5 & 7), & December 18 (string overdubs), 1972.

Personnel
Lou Donaldson - alto saxophone
Joe Farrell, Paul Winter - flute, alto flute
Eugene Bianco - harp
Joe Venuto - vibes
Derek Smith - piano, electric piano
Jay Berliner - guitar, 12 string guitar
Richard Davis (tracks 1, 3, 6 & 8), Ron Carter (tracks 2, 4, 5 & 7) - bass
Grady Tate - drums
Omar Clay - percussion
Harry Lookofsky, Aaron Rosand, Irving Spice - violin
Harry Zaratzian, Seymour Berman - viola
Seymour Barab - cello
Wade Marcus - arranger

References

Lou Donaldson albums
1973 albums
Blue Note Records albums
Albums arranged by Wade Marcus
Albums produced by George Butler (record producer)